Dunbar Rowland (August 25, 1864 − November 1, 1937) was an American attorney, archivist, and historian.  He was Director of the Mississippi Department of Archives and History from its inception in 1902, until his death in 1937.

Early years
Born in Oakland, Mississippi, Dunbar Rowland was the youngest son of physician William Brewer Rowland and Mary Bryan Rowland.  He received his primary education at private schools in Memphis, Tennessee and prepared for college at Oakland Academy.  In 1886, Rowland received a BS degree from the A&M College in Mississippi, then pursued a law degree at the University of Mississippi, graduating in 1888.

For 5 years, Rowland practiced law in Memphis, then moved to Coffeeville, Mississippi and set up a law office. He often submitted historical articles for publication in the Commercial Appeal, Atlanta Constitution, and Mississippi Historical Society.

Career
In 1902, Dunbar Rowland became the first director of the newly created Mississippi Department of Archives and History (MDAH).  In the early years of his tenure, Rowland concentrated on collecting Confederate records to preserve and commemorate the sacrifice of Mississippi soldiers during the American Civil War.

In 1906, Rowland married Eron Opha Moore Gregory, who would become an eminent historian in her own right.

As Director of the State archives, Dunbar Rowland created a written History of Mississippi in two volumes, published in 1907.

Rowland traveled to Europe where he visited established archives in England, France and Spain, and obtained copies of historical records pertaining to territorial Mississippi. For the Mississippi archives, Rowland rejected the library-style arrangement of the state’s records and instead developed his own system that resulted in a chronological arrangement of documents for each department of government.

In archiving Confederate history in Mississippi, Rowland compiled and edited a ten-volume collection of Jefferson Davis documents, that he published in 1923. During the 1920s, Rowland organized the first archeological survey in Mississippi to collect Native American relics and perform excavations of mounds in the state to locate artifacts for preservation in the archives.

In 1925, Rowland compiled and published two additional volumes on Mississippi history that contained biographical accounts of the state’s businessmen and politicians, History of Mississippi: The Heart of the South.

Along with other state historians, Rowland used his position in state government to lobby the Mississippi congressional delegations to create the National Archives in Washington D.C., which came to fruition in 1934.  Rowland was so involved in the process that he applied to become the first director of the National Archives but was unsuccessful.

In addition to the establishment of private and public archives during his tenure at MDAH, Rowland was able to initiate the creation of a museum and a library, plus assemble literary and artistic collections that were representative of Mississippi history and culture.

His grandfather, Creed Taylor Rowland (c.1802–c.1866), had moved from Virginia to Lowndes County, Mississippi, using enslaved African Americans as a collateral for loans that allowed him to buy up large tracts of land. His grandson (in an article called "Plantation Life in Mississippi before the War", published in Mississippi Historical Society Publications, Vol. Ill) portrayed the life of enslaved African Americans in a rosy and condescending light: The slave family always had a garden spot given for their own. They were taught the pride of ownership, and many families beautified their little homes with running vines and flowers. Their food was issued to them weekly from a big 'smoke-house' that was to be found on every Mississippi plantation. It was plain, wholesome, and substantial, and consisted of bread, meat, rice, and vegetables, molasses and milk.

Death and legacy
Dunbar Rowland died on November 1, 1937 and is buried in Cedar Lawn Cemetery in Jackson, Mississippi.

Dunbar Rowland's portrait is part of the Mississippi Hall of Fame located in the Old Capitol Museum to honor his significant contributions to the state of Mississippi.

Bibliography
 Dunbar Rowland (ed). 1907. Encyclopedia of Mississippi History: comprising sketches of counties, towns, events, institutions and persons vol. I. 
 Dunbar Rowland (ed). 1907. Encyclopedia of Mississippi History: comprising sketches of counties, towns, events, institutions and persons vol. II.
Jefferson Davis, Constitutionalist: his Letters, Papers, and Speeches. 1923.
History of Mississippi: The Heart of the South. 1925.

References

Further reading

 Patricia Galloway, "Archives, Power, and History: Dunbar Rowland and the Beginning of the State Archives of Mississippi (1902-1936)," The American Archivist, vol. 69, no. 1 (Spring-Summer 2006), pp. 79–116. In JSTOR

External links
Dunbar Rowland’s Tenure at Mississippi Department of Archives and History. Retrieved 2014-01-09. 
Mississippi Department of Archives and History—A Sense of Place (Mrs. Dunbar (Eron) Rowland). Retrieved 2014-01-09.  
 
 

1864 births
1937 deaths
People from Yalobusha County, Mississippi
American archivists
20th-century American historians
American male non-fiction writers
University of Mississippi School of Law alumni
People from Coffeeville, Mississippi
20th-century American male writers
People born in the Confederate States